Browse Trist (1698?–1777), of Bowden, near Totnes, Devon, was an English politician.

He was born the son of Nicholas Trist of Bowden and educated at Wadham College, Oxford.

He was a Member (MP) of the Parliament of Great Britain for Totnes 1754 - March 1763.

In 1734 he married Agnes, daughter of Thomas Hore of Nymph, Devon, with whom he went on to have 6 sons and 3 daughters. The lived at Bowden House.

Family in America
Browse Trist's son Hore Browse Trist emigrated to the United States, where he befriended Thomas Jefferson, obtained from him a government appointment, and settled in Mississippi.

References

1698 births
1777 deaths
Members of the Parliament of Great Britain for Totnes
British MPs 1754–1761
British MPs 1761–1768